Michael Erin “Coach” Busch (January 4, 1947 – April 7, 2019) was an American politician and member of the Democratic Party who served as the 106th Speaker of the Maryland House of Delegates from 2003 until his death in 2019. Busch was a member of the House for nine terms, beginning in 1987. He represented all of legislative District 30 prior to redistricting in 2012, and represented District 30A after the district was split following the 2010 census. The district encompasses parts of Anne Arundel County, including the state capital of Annapolis.

Background
Busch was born in Baltimore and was a lifelong resident of the state of Maryland.  He attended St. Mary's High School in Annapolis and in 1970 received his B.S. degree in education from Temple University, where he was a member of the Pi Lambda Phi fraternity.

Busch was pursued by the National Football League as a running back, prior to a knee injury. Busch then returned to Maryland to coach athletics and teach.

He was married to Cynthia Abbott Busch, with whom he had two children, Erin and Megan.

Legislative career
Busch first got involved in politics at the urging of parents of his students. After winning election to the Maryland House of Delegates in 1986, Busch served on the Judiciary Committee, the Economic Matters Committee, which he later chaired, and as Chairman of the Anne Arundel County Delegation before being elected Speaker. Busch repeatedly won reelection in an evenly-split district and served alongside other delegates in District 30 from both the Republican Party and Democratic Party during his tenure in the House. As Speaker, he had significant influence over matters in the House and in state government overall. He served through 5 governors and alongside his counterpart in the state senate, long-time President of the Maryland Senate Mike Miller.

At the beginning of the 2003 session of the Maryland Legislature, Busch was elected Speaker of the House by his colleagues in the Maryland House of Delegates. He became the longest-serving Speaker in Maryland history.

Busch was known for his interest in the areas of healthcare, education, and economic development. During the 2007 legislative session, he sponsored a bill with other members of the leadership titled the Children and Working Families Healthcare Act of 2007, which proposed to provide health care access to 250,000 Marylanders and all children in the state.

Democrats held a supermajority in the House throughout Busch's terms in office. Busch successfully leveraged his party's majority to advance his legislative goals over the objections of Republican Governors Larry Hogan and Bob Ehrlich. The House overrode a number of vetoes by both aforementioned governors during Busch's time as Speaker. Some significant veto overrides include raising the state's minimum wage, twice, restoring voting rights to felons, closing a hotel sales tax loophole, increasing funding for performing arts, and creating a new Public Service Commission.

Busch had significant knowledge of procedural rules of the House and occasionally maneuvered to block efforts by the minority party to advance legislation outside the normal committee process. Notably, in 2015 Busch blocked an attempt by Republicans to put forward legislation to ban gay marriage in the state by ending the day's session abruptly in a rare move.

Speaker Busch was also instrumental in the passage of LGBTQ+ supportive legislation in Maryland. He rallied his caucus to support legislation allowing visitation rights for unmarried partners before gay marriage was legalized in the state. He also led the fight to legalize gay marriage in the state before other key lawmakers supported the measure. His first attempts to pass the legislation failed, however in 2012 he was successful in leading his caucus to pass legislation legalizing same-sex marriage. The legislation was forced to a ballot referendum in the 2012 general election. The ballot referendum, known as Question 6, passed.

Legislative notes

 sponsored The Tax Reform Act of 2007 (HB2) , which raised income tax, sales tax from 5% to 6%, and business tax from 7% to 8.25%. The bill was part of a special session that raised state revenues an estimated $1.4 Billion. 
 sponsored The Safe Schools Act of 2010, to break down communication barriers between school personnel and law enforcement
 voted for the Maryland Gang Prosecution Act of 2007 (HB713), subjecting gang members to up to 20 years in prison and/or a fine of up to $100,000 
 voted for Jessica's Law (HB 930), eliminating parole for the most violent child sexual predators and creating a mandatory minimum sentence of 25 years in state prison, 2007 
 voted for Public Safety – Statewide DNA Database System – Crimes of Violence and Burglary – Post conviction (HB 370), helping to give police officers and prosecutors greater resources to solve crimes and eliminating a backlog of 24,000 unanalyzed DNA samples, leading to 192 arrests, 2008 
 voted for Vehicle Laws – Repeated Drunk and Drugged Driving Offenses – Suspension of License (HB 293), strengthening Maryland's drunk driving laws by imposing a mandatory one year license suspension for a person convicted of drunk driving more than once in five years, 2009 
 voted for HB 102, creating the House Emergency Medical Services System Workgroup, leading to Maryland's budgeting of $52 million to fund three new Medevac helicopters to replace the State's aging fleet, 2009 
 voted for SB 715, removing the requirement to show proof of citizenship or valid social security number, allowing undocumented individuals to obtain and renew drivers licenses in the state of Maryland 
 voted for SB 422, requiring public school teachers to pay union dues, effectively removing the ability of the teacher to choose to be in the union 
 voted nay to HB 359, resulting in the denial of all handgun permits to victims of domestic abuse 
 voted for SB 269, authorizing speed monitoring systems 

Speaker Busch voted multiple times to support classroom teachers, public schools, police and hospitals in Anne Arundel County. Since 2002, throughout his Speakership, funding to schools across the state increased 82%, resulting in Maryland being ranked top in the nation for K-12 education.

Awards
2010 Most Influential Maryland Legislators (Top 20)

Death

Busch underwent a liver transplant in 2017. As his health declined, his supporters adopted the nickname "Iron Mike" to emphasize his strength and resilience as he tried to recover from the transplant. He reportedly fell ill with pneumonia on March 26, 2019, after a follow-up procedure. He was hospitalized at the University of Maryland Medical Center, where he died from complications of pneumonia and non-alcoholic steatohepatitis on April 7. Maryland Governor Larry Hogan ordered flags to be flown at half-staff following his death. Busch laid in state at the Maryland State House rotunda on April 15, 2019. His funeral took place on April 16 at St. John Neumann Church in Annapolis and was followed by a reception at the Navy-Marine Corps Memorial Stadium. He was laid to rest on April 16, 2019. Tributes from across the state flowed in following Busch's death.

Legacy
In 2019, Maryland Hall, a cultural and arts center located in Annapolis, MD renamed their center the Michael E. Busch Center for the Arts at Maryland Hall, in honor of Busch, who had fought for funding for the institution throughout his career.

In 2020, Anne Arundel County Executive Steuart Pittman, Jr. directed that the newly built Annapolis branch of the Anne Arundel County Public Library be named the Michael E. Busch Annapolis Library in Busch's  honor.

In 2020, the District 30 Democratic Club, a social political club representing the same legislative district that Busch represented, was renamed the Michael E. Busch District 30 Democratic club in his honor.

Election results
2018 Race for Maryland House of Delegates – District 30A
Voters to choose two:
{| class="wikitable"
|-
!Name
!Votes
!Percent
!Outcome
|-
|-
|Michael E. Busch, Dem.
|20,080
|  32.6%
|   Won
|-
|-
|Alice J. Cain, Dem.
|18,070
|  29.3%
|   Won
|-
|-
|Chelsea Gill, Rep.
|12,097
|  19.6%
|   Lost
|-
|-
|Bob O'Shea, Rep.
|11,324
|  18.4%
|   Lost
|-
|Other Write-Ins
|53
|  0.01%
|   Lost
|-
|}

2014 Race for Maryland House of Delegates – District 30A
Voters to choose two:
{| class="wikitable"
|-
!Name
!Votes
!Percent
!Outcome
|-
|-
|Herb McMillan, Rep.
|14,484
|  27.9%
|   Won
|-
|-
|Michael E. Busch, Dem.
|14,289
|  27.6%
|   Won
|-
|-
|Chuck Ferrar, Dem.
|11,932
|  23.0%
|   Lost
|-
|-
|Genevieve Lindner, Rep.
|11,100
|  21.4%
|   Lost
|-
|Other Write-Ins
|56
|  0.01%
|   Lost
|-
|}

2010 Race for Maryland House of Delegates – 30th District
Voters to choose three:
{| class="wikitable"
|-
!Name
!Votes
!Percent
!Outcome
|-
|-
|Ron George, Rep.
|25,631
|  19.25%
|   Won
|-
|-
|Michael E. Busch, Dem.
|23,995
|  18.02%
|   Won
|-
|-
|Herb McMillan, Rep.
|22,553
|  16.94%
|   Won
|-
|-
|Virginia P. Clagett, Dem.
|21,142
|  15.88%
|   Lost
|-
|-
|Seth Howard, Rep.
|20,080
|  15.08%
|   Lost
|-
|-
|Judd Legum, Dem.
|19,670
|  14.77%
|   Lost
|-
|}

2006 Race for Maryland House of Delegates– 30th District
Voters to choose three:
{| class="wikitable"
|-
!Name
!Votes
!Percent
!Outcome
|-
|-
|Michael E. Busch, Dem.
|22,479
|  17.1%
|   Won
|-
|-
|Virginia P. Clagett, Dem.
|22,360
|  17.0%
|   Won
|-
|-
|Ron George, Rep.
|21,811
|  16.6%
|   Won
|-
|-
|Barbara Samorajczyk, Dem.
|21,758
|  16.5%
|   Lost
|-
|-
|Andy Smarick, Rep.
|20,594
|  15.6%
|   Lost
|-
|-
|Ron Elfenbein, Rep.
|20,497
|  15.5%
|   Lost
|-
|}

2002 Race for Maryland House of Delegates – 30th District
Voters to choose three:
{| class="wikitable"
|-
!Name
!Votes
!Percent
!Outcome
|-
|-
|Michael E. Busch, Dem.
|22,422
|  17.7%
|   Won
|-
|-
|Virginia P. Clagett, Dem.
|21,875
|  17.3%
|   Won
|-
|-
|Herbert H. McMillan, Rep.
|20,972
|  16.6%
|   Won
|-
|-
|C. Richard D'Amato, Dem.
|20,545
|  16.3%
|   Lost
|-
|-
|Michael Collins, Rep.
|19,140
|  15.1%
|   Lost
|-
|-
|Nancy Almgren, Rep.
|18,861
|  14.9%
|   Lost
|-
|-
|David M. Gross, Green
|2,536
|  2.0%
|   Lost
|-
|Other Write-Ins
|71
|  0.1%
|   Lost
|-
|}

1998 Race for Maryland House of Delegates– District 30
Voters to choose three:
{| class="wikitable"
!Name
!Votes
!Percent
!Outcome
|-
|-
|-
|Michael E. Busch, Dem.
|24,075
|  21%
|   Won
|-
|-
|Virginia P. Clagett, Dem.
|24,036
|  21%
|   Won
|-
|-
|C. Richard D'Amato, Dem.
|20,223
|  18%
|   Won
|-
|-
|Phillip D. Bissett, Rep.
|18,690
|  16%
|   Lost
|-
|-
|Edward J. Turner, Rep.
|14,119
|  12%
|   Lost
|-
|-
|Anthony McConkey, Rep.
|12,353
|  11%
|   Lost
|}

1994 Race for Maryland House of Delegates – District 30
Voters to choose three:
{| class="wikitable"
!Name
!Votes
!Percent
!Outcome
|-
|-
|-
|Michael E. Busch, Dem.
|18,709
|  19%
|   Won
|-
|-
|Phillip D. Bissett, Rep.
|18,009
|  23%
|   Won
|-
|-
|Virginia P. Clagett, Dem.
|18,254
|  18%
|   Won
|-
|-
|Ralph C. Rosacker, Rep.
|16,299
|  16%
|   Lost
|-
|-
|Joan Beck, Rep.
|15,974
|  16%
|   Lost
|-
|-
|John C. Eldridge Jr., Dem.
|13,320
|  13%
|   Lost
|}

1990 Race for Maryland House of Delegates – District 30
Voters to choose three:
{| class="wikitable"
!Name
!Votes
!Percent
!Outcome
|-
|-
|John Astle, Dem.
|18,009
|  23%
|   Won
|-
|-
|Aris T. Allen, Rep.
|16,951
|  22%
|   Won
|-
|-
|Michael E. Busch, Dem.
|16,104
|  18%
|   Won
|-
|-
|Edith Segree, Dem.
|14,341
|  18%
|   Lost
|-
|-
|Phillip D. Bissett, Rep.
|13,321
|  17%
|   Lost
|}

References

External links

 Maryland Archives biography
 Campaign website biography

1947 births
2019 deaths
21st-century American politicians
Baptists from Maryland
Deaths from liver disease
Deaths from pneumonia in Maryland
Players of American football from Maryland
Politicians from Baltimore
Speakers of the Maryland House of Delegates
Democratic Party members of the Maryland House of Delegates
Temple University College of Education alumni
20th-century Baptists